Fantasia No. 4 in C minor, K. 475 is a piece of music for solo piano composed by Wolfgang Amadeus Mozart in Vienna on 20 May 1785.  It was published as Opus 11, in December 1785, together with the Sonata in C minor, K. 457, the only one of Mozart's piano sonatas to be published together with a work of a different genre.

Starting in the key of C minor, the piece is marked Adagio but then, after a section in D major, moves into an allegro section which goes from A minor to G minor, F major, and then F minor. It then moves into a fourth section in B major marked Andantino and then moves to a più allegro section starting in G minor and modulating through many keys before the opening theme returns in the original key of C minor. Most of the music is written with no sharps or flats in the key signature and uses accidentals—only the fourth section, in B major, is given a key signature.

The Austrian composer Ignaz von Seyfried combined this work with the Sonata in C minor, K. 457 and produced a four-movement arrangement for orchestra, the "Grande Fantaisie" in C minor.

References

External links
 
 Recordings and discography at the Neue Mozart-Ausgabe
 
 Performance of Fantasy and Sonata by Paavali Jumppanen from the Isabella Stewart Gardner Museum in MP3 format
 Fantasia K.475 from Article on AllAboutMozart.com

Compositions for solo piano
Compositions by Wolfgang Amadeus Mozart
1785 compositions
Mozart 4
Compositions in C minor